This article show all participating team squads at the 2004 FIVB Volleyball World League, played by 12 countries from 4 May to 18 July 2004. The Final Round was held in Rome, Italy.

The following is the  roster in the 2004 FIVB Volleyball World League.

The following is the  roster in the 2004 FIVB Volleyball World League.

The following is the  roster in the 2004 FIVB Volleyball World League.

The following is the  roster in the 2004 FIVB Volleyball World League.

The following is the  roster in the 2004 FIVB Volleyball World League.

The following is the  roster in the 2004 FIVB Volleyball World League.

The following is the  roster in the 2004 FIVB Volleyball World League.

The following is the  roster in the 2004 FIVB Volleyball World League.

The following is the  roster in the 2004 FIVB Volleyball World League.

The following is the  roster in the 2004 FIVB Volleyball World League.

The following is the  roster in the 2004 FIVB Volleyball World League.

The following is the  roster in the 2004 FIVB Volleyball World League.

References

External links
Official website

2004
2004 in volleyball